Harrogate Ladies' College is an independent boarding and day school located in the town of Harrogate, North Yorkshire, England. Founded as a girls' senior school in 1893, the college includes Highfield Prep School and educates girls from ages 2 to 18 and boys up to age 11. It is a member of the Girls' Schools Association and Allied Schools.

History 
In the 1880s, the original Harrogate College was a boys' school. The need for a girls' school in the area soon became obvious and opened in 1893. Over the years, the newly opened girls' school flourished while the boys' school was eventually closed. In 1904, the girls' school moved into the present accommodation located across the street from St Wilfrid's Church.

From 1939 to 1945, the school was evacuated to Swinton Park, and after the Second World War moved back. Additional extensions that housed a library, a science block and a gymnasium were built later in the 1950s. Later, more buildings were constructed (a sports hall in the 1980s, an art room, and the Highfield Prep School). Gradually, houses on each side of Clarence Drive were acquired and were used as boarding houses. The pre-prep department, known as Bankfield, was opened in 1997, whilst the junior school, Highfield, opened in 1999.

The college now consists of three divisions: Highfield Pre-School (boys and girls aged 2–4), Highfield Prep (boys and girls aged 4–11) and the main school (day and boarding girls aged 11–18).

Pastoral Care
As a Christian school, pupils are encouraged to attend chapel services but welcomes pupils of "all faiths or none". The school has links with the local parish church St Wilfrid's Church. A school chaplain oversees pastoral care and spiritual aspects of the school curriculum. The College has its own health and wellness centre.

House System
Upon entry, pupils are placed into one of the four houses. Over the school year, the houses will compete in inter-house competitions.

Highfield
The junior school houses are named after four of the Yorkshire Dales.
Nidderdale
Wharfedale
Wensleydale
Swaledale

Senior School
The senior school houses are separate from boarding houses. They are named after prominent British female figures in history.
Austen
Franklin
Nightingale
Pankhurst

Boarding
The school has a long boarding tradition and over half of senior school pupils are boarders. Full or flexible boarding is available to girls aged 10 and above. There are five boarding houses: Armaclare, Clarence, Lancaster, Lincoln, or Tower. The first four are situated in the heart of the campus. Tower House, which is similar to a university hall of residence and houses Upper Sixth girls, is located further away from the main school. Each house is overseen by a housemistress and full-time residential staff who look after boarders during after-school hours. The head of boarding is Laura Brookes.

Notable former pupils

 Anne McIntosh, politician
 Claire King, actress
 Elspeth Candlish Henderson, WAAF
 Genevieve Barr, actress
 Jane Carr (Rita Brunstrom), actress
 Joolz Denby, poet, novelist, artist and tattooist 
 Sheila Burnford, author
 Ella Pontefract, writer

References

External links
Harrogate Ladies' College
Yorkshirenet
ISI Inspection Report
Profile on MyDaughter

Educational institutions established in 1893
Girls' schools in North Yorkshire
Schools in Harrogate
Private schools in North Yorkshire
Member schools of the Girls' Schools Association
1893 establishments in England
Boarding schools in North Yorkshire